Bank Kerjasama Rakyat Malaysia Berhad (Jawi: بڠک کرجاسام رعيت مليسيا برحد) or Bank Rakyat (Jawi: بڠک رعيت) was established on 28 September 1954 under Ordinance Cooperation’s Act 1948, regulated by Bank Negara Malaysia (BNM) under Development Financial Institutions Act (DAFIA 2002), Ministry Of Entrepreneur Development and Cooperatives (MEDAC) and Cooperatives Commission of Malaysia.

References
	
 www.bankrakyat.com.my

External links
Ministry Of Entrepreneur Development and Cooperatives (MEDAC)

1954 establishments in Malaya
Cooperative banking in Asia
Banks established in 1954
Ministry of Domestic Trade and Consumer Affairs (Malaysia)
Islamic banks of Malaysia
Cooperatives in Malaysia
Companies based in Kuala Lumpur
Malaysian brands